Fallisia is a genus of the family Plasmodiidae.

The genus was created by Lainson, Landau and Shaw in 1974. A revision of the genus Plasmodium by Levine in 1985 considered this subgenus to be a synonym of Plasmodium. The description of a new species Plasmodium siamense by Telford in 1986 lead to a resurrection of this as a subgenus. Further revision of its taxonomic status has led to its elevation to genus status.

Species in this genus infect birds and lizards.

Diagnostic features 

Species in this genus have the following characteristics:

The schizonts and gametocytes are found in the circulating leukocytes and thromobcytes.

Pigment is absent.

Subgenera 

There are two recognised subgena - Fallisia Telford 1998 and Plasmodiodes Gabaldon, Ulloa & Zerpa 1985. Species in Fallisia infect lizards and those in Plasmodiodes infect birds.

Until confirmed by molecular methods this classification should be regarded as tentative.

Host distribution 

These species infect lizards of the Iguanidae and Teiidae. They may also infect the Scincidae.

Distribution

These parasites are found in the Neotropical area.

References 

Apicomplexa genera
Haemosporida